Vladislav Igorevich Molchan (born 21 September 2000) is a Russian professional footballer who plays as a defender for Ligue 2 club Caen.

Career

Early career 
Molchan is a product of Zenit Saint Petersburg's academy. He was the captain of the U19 team of the club, and played two UEFA Youth League matches during the 2019–20 season.

Molchan made his debut in the Russian Football National League for Zenit-2 Saint Petersburg on 17 July 2018 in a game against Tambov. He left Zenit in 2020 to join Yenisey Krasnoyarsk, where he would go on to play a total of three games.

Caen 
In October 2020, Molchan signed for Ligue 2 club Caen in a deal worth €11,000. Due to a visa problem, he arrived in Normandy in early December. He started the 2021–22 season in the reserve team that plays in the fourth tier of French football.

References

External links
 
 Profile by Russian Football National League
 

2000 births
Living people
Russian footballers
Association football defenders
Footballers from Saint Petersburg
FC Zenit Saint Petersburg players
FC Zenit-2 Saint Petersburg players
FC Yenisey Krasnoyarsk players
Stade Malherbe Caen players
Russian First League players
Championnat National 2 players
Russian expatriate footballers
Expatriate footballers in France
Russian expatriate sportspeople in France